Walking in Light is a single from New Zealand band Th' Dudes. It reached No. 50 on the New Zealand music charts.

References 

1979 singles
Th' Dudes songs
1979 songs
Songs written by Dave Dobbyn